(1934 - ), also called Ryūsen, is the founder of the Okinawan Ijun religion. 

Takayasu was born in the Okinawan city of Naha in 1934. Since early childhood he played children's roles in the Okinawan theatre. His first spiritual experience, as related by himself, was while being evacuated to Taiwan near the end of World War II, he experienced sharp physical pain as Okinawa was bombarded by warships. After the war he started to show interest in religious activities and in 1972 created the movement known today as Ijun. 

Takayasu also developed a new concept of deity and a new system of belief. In 1992 Takayasu changed his given name from Rokurō to Ryūsen.

References
SHIMAMURA Takanori. "Okinawano shinshukyo ni okeru kyoso hosa no raifu hisutorii to reino-- 'Ijun' no jirei" [The life history and spiritual power of an assistant to the founder of a new religion in Okinawa: an example from the religion of 'Ijun'], Jinrui bunka 8 (Tsukuba Daigaku Rekishi Jinruigaku-kei Jinrui Bunka Kenkyukai).
 Ijun

1934 births
Japanese religious leaders
Living people
Founders of new religious movements